The Prize of the Cabinet of Ministers of Ukraine for Special Achievements of Youth in Development of Ukraine is a government award established in 1999 by the Cabinet of Ministers of Ukraine to celebrate significant achievements of youth in various spheres of public life, and to encourage youth to participate in public life.

Initially, it was called the Prize of the Cabinet of Ministers of Ukraine for significant achievements of young people in various spheres of public life. In 2000 it was renamed the Prize of the Cabinet of Ministers of Ukraine for special achievements in youth in the development of Ukraine.

The prize is awarded to persons under the age of 35 for achievements in the development of Ukraine during the calendar year preceding its award and may also take into account the achievements of the candidate for the award in previous years.

Every year the list of laureates is approved by the Cabinet of Ministers by its order, each laureate is awarded a diploma, a badge, and a monetary reward is paid. Up to 20 prizes in the amount of UAH 50,000 each are awarded annually.

Laureates
Olena Bilosiuk
Anastasia Dmitruk
Ihor Huz
Olha Kharlan
Alina Komashchuk
Pavlo Korostylov
Yaryna Matlo
Anastasiya Merkushyna
Ruslan Riaboshapka
Mykhailo Romanchuk
Olha Saladukha
Valentyna Semerenko
Vita Semerenko
Ruslan Stefanchuk
Olga Sviderska
Oleksandr Vorobiov

References

State Prizes of Ukraine
Badges
 Cabinet of Ministers of Ukraine
Ukrainian awards
1999 in Ukraine
Laureates of the Prize of the Cabinet of Ministers of Ukraine for special achievements of youth in the development of Ukraine